Nelapadu may refer to:

Nelapadu, Amaravati, a neighbourhood of Amaravati, Guntur district, Andhra Pradesh, India
Nelapadu, Tenali mandal, a village in Tenali mandal, Guntur district, Andhra Pradesh, India